Jeremiah Wilfred Heffernan was a provincial politician from Alberta, Canada. He served as a member of the Legislative Assembly of Alberta from 1921 to 1926 sitting with the Liberal caucus in opposition.

Political career
Heffernan ran for a seat to the Alberta Legislature as a Liberal candidate in the Edmonton electoral district in the 1921 Alberta general election. He won the fifth place seat to complete the sweep of Liberal candidates in that district despite his party losing government that election.

References

External links
Legislative Assembly of Alberta Members Listing

Alberta Liberal Party MLAs
1884 births
1969 deaths